The 1993 New York City Comptroller election was held on November 2, 1993. Democratic nominee Alan Hevesi defeated Republican nominee Herman Badillo with 56.00% of the vote.

Primary elections
Primary elections were held on September 14, 1993.

Democratic primary

Candidates
Alan Hevesi, New York State Assemblyman
Elizabeth Holtzman, incumbent New York City Comptroller
Herman Badillo, former U.S. Representative

Results

General election

Candidates
Major party candidates
Alan Hevesi, Democratic
Herman Badillo, Republican

Other candidates
Barbara S. Bollaert, Right to Life
Howard Lim Jr., Conservative
Natalie Harris, Socialist
Vicki Kirkland, Libertarian

Results

References

1993 United States local elections
New York City Comptroller
Election Comptroller
Comptroller 1993